In some cases the deposed head of state or head of government are allowed to go into exile following a coup or other change of government, allowing a more peaceful transition to take place or to escape justice. In some cases, governments in exile are created.

There have also been instances where they managed to return to power, as did Charles II of England. 

Examples in chronological order include:

Notes

References